Aspergillus hordei is a species of fungus in the genus Aspergillus. It is from the Robusti section. The species was first described in 2017. It has been isolated from barley in the United States. It has been reported to produce asperglaucide, aurantiamide, aurantiamide B, cristatine A, and echinulin.

References 

hordei
Fungi described in 2017